Naran-e Olya (also Romanized as Nārān-e ‘Olyā; also known as Nārān and Nūrūn) is a village in Sarduiyeh Rural District, Sarduiyeh District, Jiroft County, Kerman Province, Iran. At the 2006 census, its population was 148, in 34 families.

References 

Populated places in Jiroft County